The Pennsylvania House of Representatives is the lower house of the bicameral Pennsylvania General Assembly, the legislature of the U.S. state of Pennsylvania. There are 203 members, elected for two-year terms from single member districts.

It is the largest full-time state legislature in the country. The New Hampshire House of Representatives is larger but only serves part-time.

Qualifications
Representatives must be at least 21 years of age. They must be a U.S. citizen and a PA resident four years, and a resident of that district one year prior to their election and must reside in that district during their term.

Hall of the House
The Hall of the House contains important symbols of Pennsylvania history and the work of legislators.
 Speaker's Chair: a throne-like chair of rank that sits directly behind the Speaker's rostrum. Architect Joseph Huston designed the chair in 1906, the year the Capitol was dedicated.
 Mace: the House symbol of authority, peace, order and respect for law rests in a pedestal to the right of the Speaker. Its base is solid mahogany, intricately carved and capped by a brass globe engraved with the Pennsylvania coat of arms. An American Eagle perches on top. The tradition of the mace may date to the Roman Republic when attendants of Roman consuls carried bundles of sticks wrapped around an axe to enforce order. The tradition may also come directly from Pennsylvania's English heritage.
 Murals:  a colorful panorama of Pennsylvania history appear in murals by Edwin Austin Abbey. The most commanding of the series hangs behind the Speaker's rostrum and dominates the wall behind the Speaker. It is called The Apotheosis of Pennsylvania
 Ceiling: a work of art in itself with its ornate geometry of gold leaf buttoned at the center by a charming painted illustration. In "The Hours", Abbey represents the passage of time in the form of 24 maidens revolving in an endless circle amidst the moon, the sun and the stars of the Milky Way.

Speaker of the House

The speakership is the oldest elected statewide office in the Commonwealth.  Since its first session in 1682—presided over by William Penn—over 130 house members have been elevated to the speaker's chair. The house cannot hold an official session in the absence of the speaker or their designated speaker pro tempore.  Speaker Leroy Irvis was the first African American elected speaker of any state legislature in the United States since Reconstruction. Speaker Dennis O'Brien was the only minority-party Speaker known in Pennsylvania and only the second known nationwide.

Composition

Current session
:

Leadership
:

Speaker of the House of Representatives: Joanna McClinton (D)

Current members
:

Past composition of the House of Representatives

Committees 
:

See also
 Pennsylvania State Senate
 Project Vote Smart (Pennsylvania State Legislative information and voting records is the link to the Pennsylvania section.)
 List of Pennsylvania state legislatures

Notes

References
Specific

General

External links

The Constitution of the Commonwealth of Pennsylvania
 Pennsylvania House of Representatives
 State House of Pennsylvania information and voting records This link leads to information about elected officials and candidates in Pennsylvania on the website "Project Vote Smart." This web site provides such information for all states in the US.

House
State lower houses in the United States